Francesca Verones (born 30 May 1984 in Bern, Switzerland) is a Swiss-Italian environmental engineer and Professor at the Industrial ecology programme at the Norwegian University of Science and Technology. Her areas of research are life cycle analysis, life cycle impact assessment and biodiversity analysis, and she is especially interested in aquatic and marine areas.

Rewards 
In 2013 Verones was granted the Otto Jaag Gewässerschutzpreis (Otto Jaag's water protection prize) for an outstanding thesis on water protection/hydrologi from ETH Zurich for the PhD thesis  Methodologies for the evaluation of water use related impacts on biodiversity within Life Cycle Assessment.

In 2019 she received the Laudise medal from the International Society for Industrial Ecology, for outstanding efforts in industrial ecology by a researcher under 36 years. In the nomination, Verones was described as "a brilliant young scholar who is pioneering the assessment of biodiversity effects in Life Cycle Assessment."

Francesca Verones received an ERC Starting Grant in 2019 for the project: ATLANTIS – Whales, waste and sea walnuts: incorporating human impacts on the marine ecosystem within the life cycle impact assessment.

References

External links 

Verones' profile page, NTNU

Living people
1984 births
Swiss engineers
ETH Zurich alumni
Scientists from Bern
Academic staff of the Norwegian University of Science and Technology
Swiss expatriates in Norway
21st-century Swiss women scientists